Jaurrieta or Eaurta is a town and municipality located in the province and autonomous community of Navarre, northern Spain.

Mayor 
Nekane Moso Elizari, Jaurrieta's mayor since 2011, died in January 2022.

References

External links
Jaurrieta at Google.maps
 JAURRIETA in the Bernardo Estornés Lasa - Auñamendi Encyclopedia (Euskomedia Fundazioa) 

Municipalities in Navarre